Walter Darlington "Dee" Huddleston (April 15, 1926 – October 16, 2018) was an American politician. He was a Democrat from Kentucky who represented the state in the United States Senate from 1973 until 1985. Huddleston lost his 1984 Senate re-election campaign to Mitch McConnell in an upset by 5269 votes.

Early life
Huddleston was born in Burkesville, Kentucky. After he graduated from high school, he enlisted in the United States Army and served as a tank gunner in Europe during and after World War II from 1944 to 1946. He then attended the University of Kentucky with support from the G.I. Bill, and he graduated in 1949. In 1947, Huddleston married Martha Jean Pearce, who died in 2003.

After graduating from college, Huddleston worked as the sports and program director for WKCT in Bowling Green, Kentucky. In 1952, he became the general manager of WIEL in Elizabethtown, Kentucky. He later became president of the Kentucky Broadcasters Association.

Career
Huddleston entered politics in 1964 when he was elected to the Kentucky State Senate. He was elected as a state senator in 1965, serving until 1972; for a time, he was the body's majority leader.

In 1972, Huddleston ran for the United States Senate seat which was being vacated by retiring Republican John Sherman Cooper. He narrowly defeated Republican Louie B. Nunn, a recent former governor, receiving a 51% to 48% margin. Huddleston was reelected in 1978 with 61 percent of the vote over the former Republican state Representative Louie R. Guenthner Jr., of Louisville.

In 1984, Huddleston's Republican opponent was Jefferson County (Louisville) Judge-Executive Mitch McConnell. McConnell gained political traction with a series of television campaign ads mocking Huddleston's attendance record in the Senate. McConnell accused him of putting "his private speaking engagements ahead of his Senate responsibilities." Despite these ads, the race was very close, with McConnell only defeating Huddleston when the last returns came in (49.9% to 49.5%).

Post-Senate career
Huddleston was known as a member of the moderate wing of the Democratic Party, as was typical of party members from Kentucky.

In the late 1980s, Huddleston served on the National Board of Advisors of the Federation for American Immigration Reform, an anti-immigration group advocating for a lower rate of legal immigration.

In 2012, Huddleston announced he was stepping down as chairman of First Financial Service Corporation.

Death
Huddleston died on October 16, 2018, in Warsaw, Kentucky, in his sleep at his son Stephen's house. He was 92 years old. Sen. Mitch McConnell issued a statement on Huddleston's death soon after, in which he honored Huddleston's "tenacity," and stated that both he and his wife, Elaine Chao, were "saddened" when they heard of his passing.

References

External links

|-

|-

1926 births
2018 deaths
United States Army personnel of World War II
American radio executives
Democratic Party United States senators from Kentucky
Democratic Party Kentucky state senators
Military personnel from Kentucky
People from Burkesville, Kentucky
People from Elizabethtown, Kentucky
United States Army soldiers
University of Kentucky alumni
Members of Congress who became lobbyists